Naseeb is a 1981 Indian Hindi-language masala film produced and directed by Manmohan Desai, and written by Kader Khan. It is a typical Manmohan Desai film starring, Amitabh Bachchan, Shatrughan Sinha, Rishi Kapoor, Hema Malini, Reena Roy, Kim in lead roles and Pran, Prem Chopra, Shakti Kapoor, Kader Khan, Amjad Khan, Amrish Puri in supporting roles, along with Jeevan in a small positive role. The music is by the Manmohan Desai regulars Laxmikant–Pyarelal.

Naseeb was a hit at box office.

The film was later remade in Tamil as Sandhippu (1983) and in Telugu as Trimurtulu (1987).

Amitabh Bachchan and Shatrughan Sinha were shooting for Dostana, Shaan, and Naseeb during the same time, simultaneously.

Plot 

Naseeb, a story of destiny and fate, begins with a lottery ticket. A drunken man who cannot pay his tab trades: he decides to sell his ticket to the waiter, Naamdeo (Pran). Namdeo purchases this ticket with his three friends Damu (Amjad Khan), Raghu (Kader Khan) and Jaggi (Jagdish Raj). Using a system of drawing out the highest card to decide who keeps the ticket, Jaggi wins, and the ticket stays with him. When the ticket turns out to be a winner, Damu and Raghu turn on the other two, murdering Jaggi and framing Namdeo, However, Damu takes a photo of Raghu killing Jaggi. Namdeo goes on the run, but Raghu and Damu intervene and throw him over a bridge into a river. Namdeo is presumed dead.

Twenty years later, Damu and Raghu have used their stolen lottery money to build a fabulous hotel and make millions, becoming very successful businessmen. Damu has used a share of his money to send his youngest son, Vicky (Shatrughan Sinha), to school in England. They have even employed Namdeo's oldest son Johnny (Amitabh Bachchan), Vicky's best friend, as a waiter in the hotel. By coincidence (or by fate!) Johnny and Vicky fall in love with the same beautiful singer, Miss Asha (Hema Malini). Julie (Reena Roy) is a childhood friend of Vicky's who is in love with him, but he only sees her as a friend. When Johnny discovers this, he and Julie sacrifice their own love to ensure that Vicky and Asha get together. At the same time, Johnny's younger brother Sunny (Rishi Kapoor) has fallen for Asha's younger sister, Kim (Kim Yashpal). Namdeo has revealed to be rescued by a person called Don. He sends Namdeo undercover to investigate the death of KK after Damu kills him. Mrs Gomes sees him and in excitement, falls off a bus and becomes unconscious. Raghu's and his sons plan to kill Damu and Vicky for their own financial gains. His younger son Ashok shoots at them but they survive. Namdeo knocks out Ashok and Vicky and takes them away. Johnny follows him.   Namdeo gets into a fight with Johnny and is about to kill him just as Mrs. Gomes regains consciousness and reveals that Johnny is Namdeo's son. Kim and Asha happen to be the daughters of Jaggi, the man Namdeo supposedly murdered.

Damu confronts Raghu and reveals the photo he took of him killing Jaggi. Raghu gets into a fight with Damu, ending with Raghu's elder son Prem pushing him off the balcony, killing him. Before dying, he reveals to Sunny that the proof of Namdeo's innocence is somewhere near. Sunny finds the photo but Raghu and his son hold him at gunpoint and burn the evidence. Namdeo, Johnny and Vicky capture Raghu's younger son Ashok. Namdeo and Raghu exchange their sons at the rotating hotel with Sunny revealing another photo of Jaggi's killing. Don however, holds them hostage and takes the photo. He tells Namdeo that if he confesses to murdering Jaggi that he will free him later on. He also tells Raghu that his men will shoot Johnny, Vicky and Sunny when they get home. Asha, Julie and Kim overhear this. Don's son Zabisco tries to kill them, motivated by revenge due to Vicky closing down his casino in London. Asha, Julie and Kim break in and take Zabisco down. Johnny, Vicky and Sunny beat him up and force him to tell his father that they are all dead. That night they go to the hotel during a performance, take the photo off Don and hand it over to the police. Namdeo, Johnny, Vicky and Sunny fight their enemies. While doing so, the hotel catches fire with Zabisco and Raghu falling to their deaths. Johnny, Vicky and Sunny narrowly escape and Namdeo is proved innocent. The film ends with Namdeo owning the hotel and allowing the man who sold them his lottery ticket free food from the hotel forever, telling him never to sell his destiny.

Cast

Soundtrack 
All the songs were composed by Laxmikant–Pyarelal and the lyrics were penned by Anand Bakshi.

Cameo appearances 
One of the songs in the film sung by Mohammed Rafi, "John Jani Janardan", has cameo appearances by many actors playing themselves. The appearances include Raj Kapoor, Shammi Kapoor, Randhir Kapoor, Dharmendra, Rajesh Khanna, Rakesh Roshan, Vijay Arora, Waheeda Rehman, Sharmila Tagore, Mala Sinha, Bindu, Simi Garewal, Simple Kapadia and Prema Narayan. According to eminent film expert Rajesh Subramanian, the opening line was composed by Manmohan Desai himself. The tune was inspired by a catchy line from the song "Aksar Koi Ladka" from Bobby.

The star studded song was shot at R. K. Studios and the shooting spanned one week. Showman Raj Kapoor played an integral part in the song and during the shooting. The one-week shoot was a gala event.

Box office 

The film was an "All Time Earner", got the highest verdict (equivalent to All Time Blockbuster today) present at that time by Trade Guide Bollywood box office magazine, and was among those rare movies which crossed 1 crore per territory. There were only 13 All Time Earners (crossing 1 crore per territory) before 1984, and Naseeb was among them.

Awards and nominations 
Filmfare Best Actress Award – Hema Malini – nominated

References

External links 

1980s Hindi-language films
1980s masala films
1981 films
Cultural depictions of Rajesh Khanna
Films directed by Manmohan Desai
Films scored by Laxmikant–Pyarelal
Films set in hotels
Hindi films remade in other languages